The Springfield Armory SAINT is a series of AR-15 style semi-automatic firearms manufactured by Springfield Armory, Inc. Introduced in November 2016, the series includes rifles, short-barreled rifles (SBRs), and pistols. Variants are marketed under the SAINT, SAINT Victor, and SAINT Edge brand names. The series is primarily chambered for 5.56 NATO, while some models are also available in .308 Winchester or .300 Blackout.

History
The initial SAINT offering was an AR-15 style rifle with a  barrel and chambered in 5.56 NATO, introduced in November 2016. It was subsequently named the 2017 tactical gun of the year by American Rifleman magazine. In November 2017, a pistol version including a forearm brace was introduced. A pistol model chambered in .300 Blackout was added in April 2018. The rifle offering was updated in July 2019 with an M-LOK compatible handguard and optional flip-up front sight, while a refreshed pistol debuted in October 2019.

The SAINT Edge variant was introduced in mid-November 2017, featuring a modular trigger system, mid-sized charging handle, and muzzle brake. A year later, a pistol version of the Edge was added. Two additional Edge pistols with different braces were announced in January 2020.

The mid-range SAINT Victor variant, in rifle, pistol, and short-barreled rifle offerings, was announced in January 2019. Models chambered for .308 Winchester were later announced; rifle in April 2019, and pistol in January 2020.

Variants
In February 2019, Springfield Armory contrasted the SAINT, SAINT Victor, and SAINT Edge rifle offerings as follows:

, the Springfield Armory website lists three different SAINT rifle offerings, each of which features an M-LOK handguard and M16 (non-enhanced) bolt carrier group; one has flip-up sights and two have an A2 (fixed front) sight. Users of the SAINT have also noted older variants with an enhanced M16 bolt carrier group and no sights.

, there are 24 total variants listed on the Springfield Armory website:

 SAINT: 3 rifle, 2 pistol
 SAINT Victor: 7 rifle, 7 pistol
 SAINT Edge: 2 rifle, 3 pistol (1 available, 2 "coming soon")

The following chamberings have been made available:

Items in italics have been discontinued.

Notes

References

External links

 
 Springfield Armory Saint from Hickok45 via YouTube
 Springfield Saint Edge vs Original Saint from MarksmanTV via YouTube
 Springfield Saint Victor Rifle And Pistol Review from TFB TV via YouTube

.300 BLK firearms
Springfield Armory Inc. firearms
AR-15 style rifles
5.56×45mm NATO firearms
Firearms of the United States
Weapons and ammunition introduced in 2016